Ahmed Mathlouthi (born 18 December 1989 in Tunis) is a Tunisian swimmer. He competed at the 2012 Summer Olympics and the 2016 Summer Olympics.  As well as being a multiple times All-Africa Games medalist, he has also won 3 medals at Swimming World Cup events.

References

External links
 

Tunisian male freestyle swimmers
1989 births
Living people
Olympic swimmers of Tunisia
Swimmers at the 2012 Summer Olympics
Swimmers at the 2016 Summer Olympics
African Games gold medalists for Tunisia
African Games medalists in swimming
African Games silver medalists for Tunisia
Mediterranean Games silver medalists for Tunisia
Mediterranean Games bronze medalists for Tunisia
Mediterranean Games medalists in swimming
Competitors at the 2007 All-Africa Games
Competitors at the 2011 All-Africa Games
Swimmers at the 2009 Mediterranean Games
Swimmers at the 2013 Mediterranean Games
Swimmers at the 2015 African Games
20th-century Tunisian people
21st-century Tunisian people